Mayan most commonly refers to:
 Maya peoples, various indigenous peoples of Mesoamerica and northern Central America
 Maya civilization, pre-Columbian culture of Mesoamerica and northern Central America
 Mayan languages, language family spoken in Mesoamerica and northern Central America
 Yucatec Maya language, language spoken in the Yucatán Peninsula and northern Belize

Mayan may also refer to: 
 Mayan, Semnan, Iran
 Mayan stage, geological period that occurred during the end of the Middle Cambrian
 Mayan (band), a Dutch symphonic death-metal band
 Mayan (software)

See also
 List of Mayan languages
 Maayan (disambiguation)
 Mayan Renaissance
 Mayan-e Olya, East Azerbaijan
 Mayan-e Olya, Razavi Khorasan
 Mayan-e Sofla, East Azerbaijan
 Mayan-e Sofla, Razavi Khorasan
 Mayan-e Vosta
 Mayian, the preparation ceremony one day before a Punjabi wedding

Language and nationality disambiguation pages